Daveed Daniele Diggs (born January 24, 1982) is an American actor, rapper, and singer-songwriter. He is the vocalist of the experimental hip hop group Clipping, and in 2015, he originated the dual roles of Marquis de Lafayette and Thomas Jefferson in the musical Hamilton, for which he won a 2016 Tony Award for Best Actor in a Featured Role in a Musical. Along with the main cast of Hamilton, he was awarded a Grammy Award for Best Musical Theater Album in the same year.

Since leaving Hamilton, he played a recurring role in the television series Black-ish (2016–2018) and co-starred in the films Wonder (2017) and Velvet Buzzsaw (2019). Diggs also wrote, produced, and starred in the 2018 film Blindspotting, which earned him a nomination for the Independent Spirit Award for Best Male Lead; he acted as creator, writer, and executive producer on the 2021 spin-off sequel television series of the same name, in which he also reprised his role as a guest. As of 2020, he stars in the television adaptation of Snowpiercer. In 2021, he received a nomination for a Primetime Emmy Award for Outstanding Actor in a Supporting Role in a Limited Series or Movie for his performance in the Disney+ live stage recording of Hamilton which was released in 2020.

Early life and education 
Diggs was born in Oakland, California, the son of Barbara, a social worker, and Dountes Diggs, a bus driver. His mother is Jewish, and his father is African-American. His parents named him "Daveed", the Hebrew pronunciation of David. Diggs has said, David' means beloved in Hebrew... They spelled it with two Es because my dad liked the look of it.” His parents' ethnic and racial identities have contributed to his own self-identification: "The cultures never seemed separate—I had a lot of mixed friends. When I was young, I identified with being Jewish, but I embraced my dad's side too.”

Diggs is an alumnus of Berkeley High School and Brown University, where he graduated in 2004 with a bachelor's degree in theatre arts. He was recruited by Brown for his track skills and broke the Brown Bears' school record in the 110-meter hurdles as a sophomore with a time of 14.21 seconds. After graduating, he worked as a substitute teacher.

Career

Theater
Diggs performed in experimental theater early in his career, most notably when he was on the national tour for Marc Bamuthi Joseph's choreopoem, Word Becomes Flesh, about a nine-month pregnancy through the eyes of a young, single father. He also frequently performed in regional Shakespeare productions.

Diggs met playwright, composer, actor, and rapper Lin-Manuel Miranda through Thomas Kail while performing with the freestyle rap group Freestyle Love Supreme, or FLS. In 2012, Miranda invited Diggs to read and hear early versions of Hamilton. Diggs was impressed by Miranda's demos and passion for the project, and saw that the concept was a prospective use of the rap-musical medium. He played the roles of Thomas Jefferson and Marquis de Lafayette off Broadway in 2015, continuing with the roles when the show was moved to Broadway later in the year. For his performance, Diggs won the 2016 Tony Award for Best Featured Actor in a Musical, as well as a 2016 Grammy Award for the cast album. Diggs played his final performance in the show on July 15, 2016.

Music
Diggs is the vocalist of and writer for the experimental hip-hop and rap group clipping. The group was founded by William Hutson and Jonathan Snipes in 2009, with Diggs joining in 2010. The trio self-released their first mixtape album midcity in 2013 to fairly positive reviews. Signing with Sub Pop, they released their album CLPPNG in 2014, which they promoted with their CLPPNG Tour. In 2016, they released an EP titled Wriggle, then the album Splendor & Misery. In 2017, they released The Deep, a five-and-a-half minute track that tells the story of a society of slave descendants living underwater. In 2018, the song was nominated for a Hugo Award for Best Dramatic Presentation (Short Form). In 2019, they released an album titled There Existed an Addiction to Blood; additionally, in 2020, the group released the album Visions of Bodies Being Burned.

Diggs is a member of True Neutral Crew, with Brian Kinsman, Margot Padilla, and Signor Benedick the Moor. The group has released two EPs, #MONSANTO (2013) and 2014's #POPPUNK, as well as Live, a 20-minute short film of a live performance. They released their debut album soft rules in 2016.
 
In 2010, he made an album with Rafael Casal titled The BAY BOY Mixtape. Diggs also founded a hip hop triumvirate with Chinaka Hodge and Casal known as The Getback. The Getback later became a collaborative ensemble composed of Diggs, Hodge, Casal and other artists along with a band formed by drummer Chukwudi Hodge, turntablist Dion Decibels and Max Miller-Logan on trumpet and Keys. Though the band have diversified themselves from their work with the ensemble, they are still known as The GetBack (Get:Band) on Facebook. Two years later, in 2012, he released his first solo rap album, Small Things to a Giant, composed of original music he had written. Both The BAY BOY Mixtape and Small Things to a Giant included other artists in The Getback collective.

He is also a member of Lin-Manuel Miranda and Thomas Kail's freestyle rap group Freestyle Love Supreme, or FLS, which performs across the country.

His rapping has also been featured on tracks by Busdriver, George Watsky, Rafael Casal, and Leslie Odom, Jr., and he wrote and performed a rap number for the 2016 animated film Zootopia.

In December 2020, Diggs, along with lifelong friends William Hutson and Johnathan Snipes, partnered with Disney Channel to produce a festive song for Hanukkah. The released track, titled "Puppy for Hanukkah", is described by Disney Music and Soundtracks V.P. Steven Vincent as "inventive, humorous, and relevant".

Television
Diggs has had recurring roles on the series The Get Down, Black-ish, and Unbreakable Kimmy Schmidt. He also appeared in an episode of Law & Order: Special Victims Unit.

Diggs served as an executive producer of the 2017 ABC series The Mayor. In addition, he wrote original music for it, as well as guest starring on it. Starting in early 2017, Diggs played one of Mr. Noodle's brothers, Mr. Noodle, in the "Elmo's World" segment of Sesame Street.

In early 2018, Diggs was featured in several television commercials for the Zelle digital payment service.

In 2020, he began starring in the TNT television adaption of Snowpiercer. He also starred as Frederick Douglass in the Showtime miniseries The Good Lord Bird.

In September 2020, it was confirmed that the critically-acclaimed Casal and Diggs written film Blindspotting would be spun-off as a comedy-drama series to the same name, with Diggs set to write and executive produce. Blindspotting the TV series, follows Ashley Rose, portrayed by Jasmine Cephas Jones both in the film and show, as she navigates life after longtime partner Miles is unexpectedly incarcerated. The series was picked up by Lionsgate Television, produced by Dreams with friends Inc. and Snoot Entertainment, and was distributed by Starz. The series had its world premiere at the Tribeca Film Festival on June 11, 2021. The series became available for streaming June 13, 2021 on Starz and StarzPlay. On October 14, 2021, it was announced that the series would be renewed for a second season.

Film 
Diggs had his Hollywood film debut in the Disney animated film Zootopia, for which he wrote and performed the "Parlez Vous Rap".

Diggs appeared in the 2017 film Wonder, starring Julia Roberts and Owen Wilson. Diggs played the schoolteacher of the protagonist, a boy with a facial deformity. Diggs had a voice role in the 2017 animated film Ferdinand, in which he played the character Dos.

Alongside his lifelong friend Rafael Casal, Diggs co-wrote, co-produced, and co-starred in the 2018 film Blindspotting, which premiered at Sundance in January 2018. He received the Atlanta Film Festival's inaugural Innovator Award in April, prior to the film's theatrical release on July 27, 2018. Diggs plays Collin, a felon living in Oakland, as he tries to get through the last three days of his year-long probation without incident. Diggs and Casal wrote the film over nine years to tell a story about their quickly gentrifying hometown as they knew it. Diggs received critical praise for his performance in the film.

Diggs is currently set to voice Sebastian in Disney's live-action film The Little Mermaid. The film will reunite Diggs with Lin-Manuel Miranda, who co-wrote new songs for the film.

Personal life 
Diggs is in a relationship with Emmy Raver-Lampman, whom he met in 2015 when they were performing together in Hamilton.

Filmography

Film

Television

Theatre

Discography

The BAY BOY Mixtape (2010) - collaboration with Rafael Casal
Small Things to a Giant (2012)
Blindspotting: The Collin EP (2018)
Seven Nights in Chicago (2019) - collaboration with Rafael Casal

With clipping.
Dba118 (2012) - EP
midcity (2013)
CLPPNG (2014)
Wriggle (EP) (2016) - EP
REMXNG (2016) - EP
Splendor & Misery (2016)
There Existed an Addiction to Blood (2019)
Chapter 319 (2020)
Visions of Bodies Being Burned (2020)
Puppy for Hanukkah (2020) - collaboration with Disney Channel

With True Neutral Crew
#MONSANTO (2013) - EP
#POPPUNK (2014) - EP
soft rules (2016)

Featured artist
The Monster (2009) - featured on "Running Down" & "Wise Guys"
Mean Ones (2012) - additional vocals
Hamilton (2015) - original Broadway cast recording
Thumbs (2015) - featured on "Surrounded by Millionaires"
Good For You (2016) - single; featured rapper
Maiden Voyage Suite (2016) - EP by Sir Benedick the Moor; featured on 1200am
x Infinity (2016) - featured on Exquisite Corpse

Concerts
midcity promotional concerts (5 shows, in the US and UK, February 19, 2013 –- March 18, 2014)
CLPPNG Tour (19 shows, in the US and the UK, July 3 – November 10, 2014)
#POPPUNK promotional concerts (3 shows, in the US, July 17, 2014 – June 5, 2015)

Accolades

Honors
On May 28, 2017, an honorary Doctor of Fine Arts degree was conferred upon Diggs during the 249th commencement ceremony at Brown University, his alma mater.

References

External links 

1982 births
21st-century American male actors
21st-century American singers
African-American Jews
African-American male actors
African-American male rappers
American male musical theatre actors
Berkeley High School (Berkeley, California) alumni
Grammy Award winners
Jewish American male actors
Jewish rappers
Living people
Male actors from Oakland, California
Musicians from Oakland, California
Rappers from Oakland, California
Rappers from the San Francisco Bay Area
Tony Award winners
American male film actors
American male television actors
American male voice actors
21st-century American rappers
21st-century American male singers
Theatre World Award winners
21st-century African-American musicians
21st-century American Jews
20th-century African-American people
Brown Bears men's track and field athletes